21st Century Hits: Best of 2000–2012 is the fourth greatest hits compilation album by American country music artist Dwight Yoakam. It was released by New West Records on October 1, 2013. It includes songs from the albums Tomorrow's Sounds Today, Population Me, Blame the Vain, Dwight Sings Buck and 3 Pears, as well as a previously unreleased duet with Michelle Branch and a cover of "Crazy Little Thing Called Love" from his previous greatest hits collection, the 1999 Last Chance for a Thousand Years, that also appeared on the soundtrack to the 2006 film The Break-Up.

Track listing

Personnel

 Pete Anderson – acoustic guitar, electric guitar, baritone, mandolin, percussion
 Al Bonhomme – acoustic guitar
 Michelle Branch – duet vocals on "Long Goodbye"
 Jim Christie – drums
 Jonathan Clark – background vocals
 Dan Dugmore – pedal steel guitar
 Skip Edwards – Fender Rhodes, pedal steel guitar, keyboards, piano
 Tommy Funderburk – background vocals
 Keith Gattis – bass guitar, electric guitar
 Bob Glaub – bass guitar
 Josh Grange – keyboards, pedal steel guitar
 Bobbye Hall – percussion
 Beck Hansen – handclapping 
 Don Heffington – drums
 Scott Joss – fiddle
 Abe Laboriel Jr. – drums
 Gerry McGee – acoustic guitar, soloist
 Mitch Marine – drums
 Cole Marsden – bass guitar
 Gary Morse – banjo, dobro, lap steel guitar, pedal steel guitar
 "Good" Grief Neill – bass guitar
 Willie Nelson – duet vocals on "If Teardrops Were Diamonds"
 Buck Owens – background vocals
 Dean Parks – acoustic guitar
 Eddie "Scarlito" Perez – electric guitar, electric sitar, background vocals
 Taras Prodaniuk – bass guitar
 Raul "Criminal" Mischeif – handclapping 
 Dave Roe – background vocals
 Timothy B. Schmit – background vocals
 John Shanks – bass guitar, electric guitar, keyboards
 Kevin C. Smith – bass guitar
 Cassidy Turbin – drums, handclapping 
 Dwight Yoakam – acoustic guitar, electric guitar, soloist, lead vocals, background vocals

Chart performance

References

2013 compilation albums
Dwight Yoakam albums
Albums produced by Pete Anderson
Albums produced by John Shanks
New West Records compilation albums